Gandhi Pirantha Mann is a 1995 Indian Tamil-language action drama film directed by R. Sundarrajan. The film stars Vijayakanth, Revathi, and Ravali. It was released on 21 July 1995. The film was a box office failure.

Plot 

Rukmani (Ravali) is pampered and brought up by her father Periyavar (Radha Ravi) and uncles. Balu (Vijayakanth) manages to get married with Rukmani by hiding the truth. Balu tells her the reason why he marries her. Gandhi (Vijayakanth) and Lakshmi (Revathi), Balu's parents, were kind-hearted teachers and were transferred to a village. Gandhi and Lakshmi were determined to abolish the caste system in school. Soon, they clashed with Periyavar and his four brothers. They finally killed the innocent Gandhi. Balu is now determined to eradicate the caste hatred in Periyavar's village. What transpires later forms the crux of the story.

Cast 

Vijayakanth as Balu and Gandhi
Revathi as Lakshmi
Ravali as Rukmani
Radha Ravi as Periyavar (Gandhi)
Mansoor Ali Khan
R. Sundarrajan
Delhi Ganesh
Thalaivasal Vijay
Ponvannan
Vivek
Charle
Ponnambalam
Periya Karuppu Thevar
Sathyapriya
Kazan Khan
Balu Anand
Idichapuli Selvaraj as Narayanan
Padmapriya as Padma
Chelladurai as Arokiasamy
Suryakanth
Peeli Sivam
C. R. Saraswathi
Kokila
Pasi Narayanan
Dhanapal
Thiruppur Ramasamy
Nellai Siva
Kovai Senthil
Karate R. Thiagarajan in a guest appearance

Soundtrack 
The music was composed by Deva, with lyrics written by Gangai Amaran and R. Sundarrajan.

Reception 
R. P. R. of Kalki wrote that the director made a masala film out of a sensitive issue like caste abolition superficially without going in depth about it while praising the dual roles of Vijayakanth and Deva's music.

References

External links 

 

1990s masala films
1990s Tamil-language films
1995 action drama films
1995 films
Films directed by R. Sundarrajan
Films scored by Deva (composer)
Indian action drama films